Emmanouil  or Manolis Mantakas (Lakkoi, 1891 - Athens, 1968) was a Greek Army officer who rose to the rank of Major General, and who became a leader in the Greek Resistance and a politician.

Biography 

He was born in Lakkoi, Chania in 1891 and joined the Hellenic Army in 1910. He fought in the Balkan Wars and took part in the Movement of National Defence. He studied as a staff officer in the École Supérieure de Guerre and fought in the Asia Minor Campaign. A staunch republican, he was dismissed from the Army after the royalist coup of 1 October 1935, and took part in the abortive 1938 uprising in Chania against the dictatorial Metaxas Regime. During World War II he became a leader in the Cretan Resistance and joined the Communist-controlled National Liberation Front and the Greek People's Liberation Army resistance groups. He also served in the EAM-organized government of "Free Greece", the Political Committee of National Liberation, as Secretary for Military Affairs and later as its Vice-President, and was elected a deputy for Piraeus Prefecture in the PEEA's parliament, the "National Council".

Due to his communist affiliation, he was exiled to Makronisos in 1947–1949, during the Greek Civil War, but after his release was elected as an MP for Piraeus Prefecture with the Democratic Alignment in the 1950 and with the United Democratic Left in 1951.

References

1891 births
1968 deaths
People from Chania (regional unit)
People from Ottoman Crete
Democratic Alignment politicians
United Democratic Left politicians
Greek MPs 1950–1951
Greek MPs 1951–1952
Hellenic Army major generals
Greek military personnel of World War I
Greek military personnel of the Greco-Turkish War (1919–1922)
National Liberation Front (Greece) members
People of the Greek Civil War
Greek prisoners and detainees
Chevaliers of the Légion d'honneur
Greek communists
Republicans
Military personnel from Crete
Politicians from Crete